The posterior cecal artery (or posterior caecal artery) is a branch of the ileocolic artery.

External links 
  - "Intestines and Pancreas: Branches of Superior Mesenteric Artery"

Arteries of the abdomen